The 2007 French Open boys' doubles junior tennis competition was won by Thomas Fabbiano of Italy and Andrei Karatchenia of Belarus.

Seeds

  Roman Jebavý /  Matteo Trevisan (quarterfinals)
  Kellen Damico /  Jonathan Eysseric (final)
  Greg Jones /  Brydan Klein (first round)
  Stephen Donald /  John-Patrick Smith (semifinals)
  Guillermo Rivera Aránguiz /  Ricardo Urzúa-Rivera (quarterfinals)
  Patricio Alvarado /  Fernando Romboli (second round)
  Johnny Hamui /  Petru-Alexandru Luncanu (second round)
  Radu Albot /  Dragos Cristian Mirtea (first round)

Draw

Final eight

Top half

Section 1

Section 2

Bottom half

Section 3

Section 4

External links
 Draw

Boys' Doubles
2007